Josef Hlinomaz (9 October 1914 – 8 August 1978) was a Czechoslovak film actor, journalist, and painter. He appeared in more than 150 films and television shows between 1948 and 1978.

Selected filmography

 Komedianti (1954)
 The Strakonice Bagpiper (1955)
 The Good Soldier Schweik (1956)
 Hvězda jede na jih (1958)
 Dařbuján a Pandrhola (1960)
 Man in Outer Space (1961)
 The Fabulous Baron Munchausen (1961)
 Lemonade Joe (1964)
 The Pipes (1966)
 Happy End (1966)
 Lidé z maringotek (1966)
 The End of Agent W4C (1967)
 All My Compatriots (1968)
 Jáchyme, hoď ho do stroje! (1974)
 Za volantem nepřítel (1974)
 Rosy Dreams (1977)

References

External links
 

1914 births
1978 deaths
Male actors from Prague
People from the Kingdom of Bohemia
Czech male film actors
20th-century Czech male actors
20th-century Czech painters
Czech male painters
20th-century Czech male artists